Meng Guanglu (born 1963) is a Chinese Peking opera performer who specializes in Jing roles. He is a student of the master Qiu Shengrong.

Meng Guanglu has won the Plum Blossom Prize twice. He is a current vice-chairman of China Theatre Association and a deputy president of China Federation of Literary and Art Circles.

References

1963 births
Living people
Chinese male Peking opera actors
Male actors from Tianjin
Singers from Tianjin
20th-century Chinese  male singers
21st-century Chinese  male  singers
20th-century Chinese male actors
21st-century Chinese male actors
National Academy of Chinese Theatre Arts alumni
Middle School Affiliated to the National Academy of Chinese Theatre Arts alumni